Crotonylidene diurea (CDU) is an organic compound formed by the condensation of crotonaldehyde with two equivalents of urea. It is a white, water-soluble solid. CDU is a component of some controlled-release fertilizers.

References

Fertilizers
Horticulture
Ureas
Nitrogen heterocycles
Heterocyclic compounds with 1 ring